Roy McKittrick (August 24, 1888 – January 22, 1961) was an American politician from Salisbury, Missouri, who served as Missouri Attorney General around the time of the World War II from 1933 until 1945.  In 1944, he ran for the U.S. Senate, but Forrest C. Donnell won the seat with 49.95% of the vote defeating by McKittrick by less than 2,000 out of over 1.5 million cast.  McKittrick also served in the Missouri Senate where he served as chairman of the committee on Banks and Banking.  He had previously been elected Chariton County in 1914, 1916, and 1918.  McKittrick was educated at the Hale High School and Prairie Hill Academy.

References

|-

1888 births
1961 deaths
Missouri Attorneys General
Missouri lawyers
Democratic Party Missouri state senators
20th-century American politicians
20th-century American lawyers